Mario Eggimann (born 24 January 1981) is a Swiss former footballer who played as a defender. He also earned caps for the Swiss national team.

Club career
Born in Brugg, Switzerland, Eggimann began his career with local side FC Küttigen before moving to bigger local rivals FC Aarau where he began his professional career making his professional debut in 1998. He played at Stadion Brugglifeld for FC Aarau until 2002 when he headed to Germany to play in the Bundesliga for Karlsruher SC. In the 2006–07 season Eggimann was made captain as Karlsruher SC were champions of the 2. Bundesliga.

In March 2008, Eggimann exercised a clause in his contract by moving to Hannover 96 for €1.4 million. He signed a contract until June 2013. After the end of the 2014–15 season, Eggimann did not receive an extension of his expiring contract with Union Berlin, having only earned 17 caps caused by multiple injuries since his arrival in 2013.

In October 2015, Eggimann announced his retirement from professional football.

International career
Eggimann was captain of the Swiss U21 national team. On 7 September 2007, he played first for the Swiss national football team coming on as a half-time substitute for Johan Djourou in a 2–1 victory against Chile in Vienna. The match was part of a tournament in Austria, comprising Japan and Austria as well as Chile and Switzerland.

Eggimann was selected by then-coach Köbi Kuhn prior to Euro 2008 but did not make the final squad. He has been selected by Ottmar Hitzfeld for the 2010 World Cup.

Personal life
On 20 February 2008, Eggimann became a father for the first time to a baby girl.

References

External links
 
 

1981 births
Living people
People from Brugg
Association football defenders
Swiss men's footballers
FC Aarau players
Hannover 96 players
Karlsruher SC players
1. FC Union Berlin players
Hannover 96 II players
Swiss Super League players
Bundesliga players
2. Bundesliga players
Switzerland international footballers
Switzerland under-21 international footballers
Swiss expatriate footballers
Expatriate footballers in Germany
2010 FIFA World Cup players
Swiss-German people
Sportspeople from Aargau